The men's 1500 metre freestyle competition of the swimming events at the 1959 Pan American Games took place on 31 August (preliminaries)  and 4 September (finals). The last Pan American Games champion was James McLane of US.

This race consisted of thirty lengths of the pool, all lengths being in freestyle.

Results
All times are in minutes and seconds.

Heats
The first round was held on August 31.

Final 
The final was held on September 4.

References

Swimming at the 1959 Pan American Games